Tomas Ross may refer to:
 Tomas Ross (writer)
 Tomas Ross (actor)

See also
 Thomas Ross (disambiguation)